The 1925 Marshall Thundering Herd football team was an American football team that represented Marshall College (now Marshall University) in the West Virginia Athletic Conference during the 1925 college football season. In its first season under head coach Charles Tallman, the team compiled a 4–1–4 record, 3–0–2 against conference opponents, won the WVAC championship, and outscored opponents by a total of 138 to 29.

Schedule

References

Marshall
Marshall Thundering Herd football seasons
Marshall Thundering Herd football